The London Borough of Sutton is a London borough in south-west London, England and forms part of Outer London. It borders the London Borough of Croydon to the east, the London Borough of Merton to the north and the Royal Borough of Kingston upon Thames to the north-west; it also borders the Surrey boroughs of Epsom and Ewell and Reigate and Banstead to the west and south respectively. The local authority is Sutton London Borough Council. Its principal town is the eponymous Sutton.

The Borough has some of the schools with the best results in the country. A Trust for London and New Policy Institute report noted that Sutton had the highest rate in London of pupils achieving 5 A* – C GCSEs.  In December 2014 Sutton was described by a senior Government official as the most "normal place in Britain". In connection with this, the leader of Sutton Council described the borough as "quietly brilliant", and noted that 91% of residents say it is "a great place to live".

Low levels of recorded crime are a feature of the borough, being among the lowest in London. An Ipsos MORI poll in 2014 found that 97% of residents felt safe in the borough during the day, and 71% felt safe at night, a higher figure than in 2011.

The 2014 Family Hotspots Report, on the best places in England and Wales for families to live, placed three areas within the borough among the top 10 places in London. The areas were identified as postcodes SM1, SM2 (Sutton town) and SM3 (Cheam). A Rightmove study in 2015 found that Sutton was the fourth happiest borough in which to live out of 33 in London. It achieved the same placing in the 2016 survey.

In 2014, a survey by eMoov (Property Hot Spot Index) found Sutton to be the easiest place in the country in which to sell a property. It was shown in a national detailed Land Use Survey by the Office for National Statistics in 2005 that the London Borough of Sutton had the highest proportion of land taken up by gardens, 35.1%, of any district in England.

The London Borough of Sutton was one of the four "vanguard areas" selected in 2010 for the Big Society initiative.

History
The borough was formed in 1965 by the merger of the Municipal Borough of Sutton and Cheam with the Municipal Borough of Beddington and Wallington and Carshalton Urban District which had all previously been part of Surrey.

Districts 
 
The borough includes the areas:

 Bandon Hill
 Beddington
 Belmont
 Benhilton
 Carshalton
 Carshalton Beeches
 Carshalton on the Hill
 Cheam
 Hackbridge
 Little Woodcote
 North Cheam
 Rosehill
 St. Helier
 South Beddington
 Sutton (principal town)
 Sutton Common
 Sutton High Street (located within Sutton) 
 The Wrythe
 Wallington
 Woodcote Green
 Worcester Park

Surrounding area

Culture and leisure

The London Borough of Sutton was once made up of rural villages, associated with feudal and royal estates. The "village feel" persists, and places in the borough such as Carshalton, Cheam and Belmont continue to be referred to as villages. The historic development of the borough is reflected in the number of heritage areas designated as conservation areas and as areas of special local character.  Descriptions of a selection of the borough's cultural institutions and attractions are set out below.

The Sound Lounge

The Sound Lounge, a grassroots concert venue, opened in December 2020 in Sutton High Street in the former premises of Royal Bank of Scotland. It hosts live performances of blues, Americana, folk and roots music.  The venue includes a plant-based, carbon-neutral café, and hosts visual art exhibitions, theatre and dance.  The site also incorporates a vinyl record shop (one of two branches of the Union Music Store).

In July 2021 the venue became the country's first grassroots music venue to be certified as carbon neutral. A wide variety of measures have been put in place to achieve neutrality.  In addition to the fully plant-based menu for the café, these include getting all energy from renewable sources, not sending any waste to landfill and maintaining an allotment garden on site for zero-carbon produce for the café.

The Charles Cryer Theatre, Carshalton

The Charles Cryer Studio Theatre is situated on the High Street (number 39) in Carshalton Village.
 It was opened by His Royal Highness Prince Edward in 1991. 
 As well as drama and musicals, productions included comedy and dance.  With material ranging from Shakespeare to Chekov to panto and children's favourites, the theatre's aim was to balance popularity with quality. The theatre also served as a concert venue for local bands and played host to the popular local Rockshot festival. The theatre is named after the man who led the campaign to open the Secombe Theatre, Sutton, listed below. In August 2016 Sutton Theatres Trust, which owned the theatre, went into administration and it closed. However, at a meeting in October 2018, the local council confirmed that the theatre would be brought back into use, following a successful bid to run the venue (on a 25-year lease) by Cryer Arts Ltd. The company plans a range of events, including music, film and theatre.

The Secombe Theatre, Sutton town centre

The Secombe Theatre (named after Sir Harry Secombe) was in Cheam Road, adjacent to the Holiday Inn Hotel. The theatre was opened by Sir Harry, who lived in Sutton for over 30 years of his life.
 The theatre was created out of a former Christian Scientist church building originally dating from 1937. The main auditorium seats 396 (or 343 if the orchestra pit is in use), and there is a large multi-purpose function room attached.  The Secombe Theatre is operated in conjunction with the Charles Cryer Studio Theatre, named after the man who led the campaign to open the Secombe Theatre.  (The Charles Cryer Theatre is in a converted hall in nearby Carshalton – see entry above). Productions at the Secombe have ranged in content from modern productions to new twists on older, more established plays. Some productions have been produced locally, while others have come as part of touring groups. From time to time comedians and musicians have appeared at the theatre.

In 2014, because of local council budget cuts, the venue was, along with its sister theatre, the Charles Cryer Theatre in Carshalton, identified by the Theatre Trust as one of 33 theatres in the country for inclusion on its "At Risk" register. The risk of closure spurred celebrity intervention in favour of the two theatres: writer, actor, comedian and BBC presenter Tim Vine, called on Sutton Council to reconsider its proposals. On 10 November 2014 the local council announced that four organisations submitting outline bids to take over the two theatres had been invited to submit full business cases by 12 December. The council worked with the Theatres Trust and Sutton Centre for Voluntary Services to help bidders through the bidding process. On 15 January 2015 the bid by the new "Sutton Theatres Trust" (STT) was given approval by the council's environment and neighbourhood committee to take over the theatres, thus saving them from closure. In August 2016 the Trust went into administration and the theatre closed permanently.

Carew Manor, Beddington

Beddington Park is the location of Carew Manor which was the home of the Beddington branch of the Carew family. The Grade I listed great hall, which boasts a fine hammerbeam roof, survives from the Tudor house along with part of the early 18th-century orangery built around the orange trees planted by Sir Francis Carew in the 16th century and claimed to be the first in England. In the grounds is an early 18th-century Grade II* listed dovecote. Archaeologists have recently discovered a Tudor garden including a grotto at Carew Manor, believed to have been created by Sir Francis Carew in the 16th century. There are tours of the great hall organised by the London Borough of Sutton Museum & Heritage Service.

Church of St Mary the Virgin, Beddington, Sutton

The Grade II* listed 14th-century flint parish church of St Mary's occupies a prominent position in Beddington Park, immediately south of what is now Carew Manor School and which was from the late Middle Ages the seat of the Carew family. It contains an organ screen by William Morris. The church is designated at Grade II for the following principal reasons:
It has substantial amounts of fabric from the 14th and 15th centuries  
It was extensively restored and provided with an extremely elaborate and interesting mid-Victorian decorative scheme.
It has monuments and other fixtures of importance from c. 1200 to the 20th century, including font and Carew tombs.
The Morris and Co. organ is of special note, and the Last Judgment reredos is unusual.

River Wandle

It passes through  Croydon, Sutton,  Merton, and Wandsworth where it joins the River Thames. The river changed from being a mainly rural one lined with a scattering of watermills at the beginning of the 19th century to a heavily built-up one by the 1930s. In the second half of the 20th century the river changed again, as the local authorities made improvements to its visual appearance and restored it as a habitat for wildlife. Much of the River is accessible using the Wandle Trail, which passes through Sutton borough at Beddington, Hackbridge and Carshalton (including Grove Park in Carshalton Village).

Little Holland House, Carshalton
Little Holland House in Carshalton Beeches was the home of the artist Frank Dickinson (1874–1961). Dickinson's Arts and Crafts style interior was influenced by John Ruskin and textile designer and artist William Morris. The house contains many of his art works. Admission is free and the house is open 1.30–5.30pm the first Sunday of each month plus Bank Holiday Sundays and Mondays.

Sutton Library, Sutton town centre
Sutton Library is situated close to the top of the town, near St Nicholas Church and the Holiday Inn Hotel, and is part of a complex which contains the Civic Offices, home of Sutton Borough Council, and the Sutton College of Liberal Arts. It is the largest library in the borough.  Originally opened in 1975, it was extensively refurbished in 2004 to meet changing customer needs. It was the first public library to appoint a library writer-in-residence; the first to establish a CD and video lending library; and the first to offer a full public library service on Sundays.
The library is arranged over four storeys, and the lending and reference facilities extend to a reader's lounge; café and shop; IT facilities; opportunities to listen to music; and a children's library themed around the world's environments.

Sutton Life Centre, Sutton
The Sutton Life Centre is an £8 million community facility designed to improve life chances for younger people and encourage good citizenship.  Its key feature – the lifezone – is a virtual street, a room with screens on all walls showing real-life scenes from Sutton's streets. It also has a library, a café, a climbing wall, and community, eco, sports, youth and media zones. It tries to encourage community engagement and involvement. It was opened on 27 October 2010 by Deputy Prime Minister Nick Clegg.

Honeywood Museum, Carshalton

Honeywood is a large house at the western end of Carshalton Ponds. At its earliest it dates from the 17th century but has been much extended and restored, particularly in the period 1896 to 1903 when a large Edwardian wing was added to the south side. It now houses the London Borough of Sutton's main Museum and has a local history collection, including objects that date back to the Bronze Age. The museum has recently been refurbished, reopening in May 2012 with enhanced features. Among others improvements, there are now expanded displays about the river Wandle and its influence on the life of the area, including an interactive map.

Arts Network Sutton
Arts Network Sutton "promotes, champions, nurtures and acts as a voice for the arts" in the borough. Taking over from the former Sutton Arts Council, it was put in place in April 2014, and launched by the Mayor of Sutton in June. It co-ordinates the arts locally and works together with 
regional and national arts bodies, informs the local arts community about arts initiatives,
seeks out funding for local projects and runs events.

Public art in Sutton town centre

There are a number of examples of public art in Sutton town centre, ranging from building-height murals, to sculptures to an armillary.  These are all fully described in the article on the town of Sutton itself.  Of particular borough-wide note is one of the murals, which is in the form of a mosaic measuring 9 metres (30 feet) in height and 5 metres (16 feet approximately) in width, and covering the whole of a three-storey wall in the town square near the Waterstones bookshop.  It was made from vitreous ceramic tesserae (small tiles made of glass and clay), and put in place in 1994. It was commissioned to celebrate Sutton's heritage, and shows several aspects of the borough's heritage and local history in a geometric pattern of nineteen panels. The centre-piece is the depiction of Henry VIII's palace at Nonsuch. Other panels depict armorial bearers from the old local families, as well as industrial and architectural heritage.

Whitehall Gallery, Cheam

Whitehall is a timber framed and weatherboarded house in the centre of Cheam village. It was originally built in about 1500 as a wattle and daub yeoman farmer's house but has been much extended. The external weatherboarded appearance dates from the 18th century. In the garden there is a medieval well which served an earlier building on the site. Now an historic house museum, the building features a period kitchen, and house details from the Georgian, Victorian and Edwardian eras. The museum temporarily closed in 2016 to allow for a £1.6m refurbishment of the building. It will reopen in 2017 with improved facilities.

Nonsuch Mansion, Cheam

Nonsuch Mansion is a Gothic revival mansion within Nonsuch Park. The service wing is occasionally open to the public. It is a popular place for wedding receptions, as it is available for hire.  In medieval times it was part of the three thousand acre manor of Cuddington. The mansion was originally built in 1731–1743 by Joseph Thompson and later bought by Samuel Farmer in 1799. He employed Jeffry Wyattville to rebuild it in a Tudor Gothic style in 1802–1806. Farmer was succeeded by his grandson in 1838 under whom the gardens became famous. Nonsuch Mansion bears a resemblance in its design to the original design of Nonsuch Palace, whose construction was begun by King Henry VIII in the 16th century. Built within the north porch of the mansion is a block from the original Nonsuch Palace that bears an inscription which means "1543 Henry VIII in the 35th year of His reign."

Listed buildings
Within the London Borough of Sutton there are 147 Grade II listed buildings, six Grade II* listings, one Grade I listing, 4 'B’ listings and 6 C listings.

Governance 

Local council seat distribution as of May 2018:

The main local government of the borough is Sutton London Borough Council.  The Council has had a Liberal Democrat administration since 1986.  From 1965 to 1986 Conservatives administered the council. At the 2010 London local elections the Liberal Democrats returned 43 councillors, the Conservatives 11 and the Labour Party lost all of its seats on the Council.

At the 2018 local elections, three independents led by former Liberal Democrat councillor Nick Mattey won Beddington North ward after campaigning against the Council's controversial plans to build a waste incinerator as part of a contract with Viridor. The Liberal Democrats lost a further nine seats to the Conservatives. One seat in Nonsuch ward was decided by a coin toss, which was won by the Conservatives.

Councillor Ruth Dombey is the Leader of the Council. The Leader of the Opposition is Councillor Tim Crowley.  Graham Tope, later Lord Tope was the Leader of the Council from 1986 to 1999.

National Politics
Sutton is divided into two parliamentary constituencies, Sutton and Cheam and Carshalton and Wallington with one member of Parliament each:

 London Assembly
As the London Assembly has eleven London-wide members from all four main parties, the borough shares its geographical London Assembly member with neighbouring Croydon, in its elections which began in 2000 and take place with the election of the Mayor of London, a Conservative Assembly member has gained a large majority (in other words it is arguably a safe seat). The current Assembly Member is Steve O'Connell, then a local councillor from Croydon, who was elected with an increased share of the vote of 43% following fellow conservative Andrew Pelling's time representing the area. 
European Parliament
Sutton was represented in the European Parliament by the London constituency.

Demographics

The proportion of Black, Asian and ethnic minorities in general living in the borough has almost doubled each decade since 1991: in 2019 Council data put the non white population at 26.8%, and the total White population at 73.2%. White British is the largest ethnic group at 62.6; this is down 10% from the 2011 census. The Filipino community is the largest foreign-born population in Sutton, closely followed by the Sri-Lankan (Tamil) community.

Ethnicity

Big Society
The London Borough of Sutton was one of the four "vanguard areas" selected in 2010 for the Government's Big Society initiative. Sutton was chosen because of its reputation for having a strong sense of community, its active voluntary sector and its track record of devolving power to its neighbourhoods.

Notable individuals

Notable individuals closely associated with the borough:
 Tom Abbott, broadcaster for Golf Channel and NBC 
 Martin Adams, BDO Darts World Champion
 Joan Armatrading, singer-songwriter & musician, lived in Sutton in the 1970s.
 Harry Aikines-Aryeetey, athlete, attended Greenshaw High School
 Terry and Jonathan Austen, micronation creators
 Ben Barnes, actor, attended Homefield Preparatory School.
 Jeff Beck, musician – rock guitarist: one of the three noted guitarists to have played with the Yardbirds (the other two being Eric Clapton and Jimmy Page). 
 David Bellamy, broadcaster and botanist, attended Sutton Grammar School.
 Sally Bercow, wife of the former Speaker of the House of Commons, John Bercow.
 Johnny Borrell, guitarist, singer and frontman of the band Razorlight.
 Seb Brown, Sutton United goalkeeper, attended Cheam High School
 Paul Burstow, MP for Sutton and Cheam was born in Carshalton, and was educated at Carshalton College
 Angus Calder, writer, historian and academic
 Rob Davis, Lead Guitarist of Mud
 Lord Peter Ritchie Calder, author, journalist and academic
 Sir Nicholas Carew, sheriff of Surrey and Sussex, Master of the King's Horse, executed by Henry VIII
 Sir Francis Carew, grandson of the above, of Beddington Park, Elizabethan horticulturalist
 Noël Coward, actor and playwright lived in Lenham Road, Sutton until the age of six
 John Clinch, cricketer
 James Cracknell OBE, Olympic gold medallist in rowing
 Quentin Crisp, writer, author, raconteur
 Clark Datchler, lead singer of Johnny Hates Jazz
 Sir John Fellows(c. 1671–1724), of the South Sea Company
 Eddie George later Lord George (1938–2009) GBE DL, PC,(16 September 1938 – 18 April 2009), Governor of the Bank of England 1993–2003.
 Les Gray, lead vocalist of Mud
 Lord Hardwicke, (1690–1764) Lord Chancellor
 Darius Henderson, footballer
 Catherine Holman, actress
 James Hunt, Formula One winning racing driver.
 Penelope Keith, actress, and famous for her role in The Good Life, was born in Sutton.
 Ruth Kelly, former Labour Party member of parliament and Transport Secretary, attended Sutton High School.
 Rebecca Litchfield, photographer.
 Peter Loader, cricketer
 Bradley McIntosh, member of former chart topping band S Club 7, attended Greenshaw High School.
 Sir John Major KG CH, former Conservative Prime Minister
 Gary Mason, boxer
 Katie Melua, singer, songwriter, and musician
 David Mitchell (born 1980), cricketer
 Simon Conway Morris, palaeontologist, specifically research of Burgess Shale type fauna
 Dave Mount, drummer of Mud
 Joshua Pascoe, Played Ben Mitchell in Eastenders
 Peter Alfred Penfold, CMG, OBE, diplomat, attended Sutton Grammar School.
Dr John Radcliffe, royal physician and MP see Radcliffe Camera, Radcliffe Infirmary and the Radcliffe Observatory
 Michael Reeves, film director and screenwriter, best known for the 1968 film Witchfinder General
Sir Cliff Richard, singer and songwriter, attended Stanley Park Junior School 
 Rebecca Romero, Olympic cycling champion
 Joanna Rowsell Shand, Olympic gold medallist in women's pursuit cycling
 Dora Russell (born Dora Black, 1894–1986), author, feminist and progressive campaigner, attended Sutton High School.
 Sir William Scawen, merchant who purchased Carshalton manor
Sir Harry Secombe, singer, comedian and entertainer. Member of the Goon Show cast. 
 Jack Simmons, historian
 Tim Smith, frontman of Cardiacs
 Alec Stewart OBE, cricketer
 Ian Stewart, co-founder of the Rolling Stones. 
 Neil Sullivan, footballer
 Sarah Tullamore, actress and singer
 Tracey Ullman, stage and television actress, comedian, singer, dancer, director, author, and screenwriter, grew up in Hackbridge.
 Tim Vine, actor and comedian
 David Weir MBE, multi-Olympic gold medallist, Paralympic athlete
 Helen Young, BBC Weather Presenter and former BBC Weather Centre Manager lives here.
 Zacron, born Richard Drew, designer of the iconic Led Zeppelin III album cover.

Education

Schools

The London Borough of Sutton has some schools at both primary and secondary levels which perform exceptionally well. Five of the state secondary schools are grammar schools.

The Borough came top of the England GCSE league tables in 2011 on the key benchmark – the percentage of pupils achieving five good GCSEs (A* to C) including English and Mathematics. The national average for 2011 was 58.2%. The average for Sutton, at 74.7%, was more than 15% above this national average.  Only three other local authorities achieved an average above 70%.
In 2013 Sutton's secondary schools bucked the national trend and performed better than in 2012. 83.9% of pupils achieved five A* to C GCSE grades in subjects including Maths and English compared with 75.6% in 2012. Sutton's GCSE performance was second across all borough's in England (The Royal Borough of Kensington and Chelsea was first).
Sutton's primary schools were described as 'particularly impressive' by Ofsted in its December 2013 annual schools report 2012–2013. It ranked Sutton's primary schools at joint third in the country and joint first in London.
In July 2016 it was announced that two schools in the borough had been named the best schools in the country in the Times Educational Supplement (TES) 2016 Awards. Stanley Park High School was named the "Best Secondary School" in the country. Limes College was named the best alternative provision school. TES described Stanley Park as having achieved "remarkable outcomes for its student body by focusing on igniting their passion for learning." The judges were "impressed by the creative, ambitious and supportive culture fostered at Stanley Park". Limes College was recognised as a place where young people are able to make a fresh start and build for the future, and where staff truly believe that every student can excel.

Schools in the borough were set to receive the fourth largest funding increase in the country in 2015/16.

In May 2014 it was announced that grammar schools in the borough planned to set aside a number of additional places specifically for Sutton borough pupils.  Nonsuch High School for Girls and Sutton Grammar School for Boys had already agreed this new policy at the time of the announcement, while the other three grammar schools in the borough were set to follow suit.

Adult education
Sutton College of Learning for Adults (SCOLA), originally named Sutton College of Liberal Arts, is a college offering over 1,000 part-time courses at its borough-wide centres. its main centres are in Sutton and Wallington.

Environment 
The London Borough of Sutton is home to a number of notable environmental projects, including the following.

BedZED (Beddington Zero Energy Development)
The acclaimed BedZED (Beddington Zero Energy Development) housing complex is located on London Road, SM6, about 500 yards north of Hackbridge mainline railway station. It uses a number of innovative technologies to enable it to operate with zero energy use.  It was designed by the architect Bill Dunster to support a more sustainable lifestyle. The project was led by the Peabody Trust in partnership with Bill Dunster Architects, Ellis & Moore Consulting Engineers, BioRegional, Arup and the cost consultants Gardiner and Theobald.

The 99 homes, and 1,405 square metres of work space were built between 2000 and 2002. It is the UK's largest and first carbon-neutral eco-community. The buildings are constructed of materials that store heat during warm conditions and release heat at cooler times, and where possible, they have been built from natural, recycled or reclaimed materials. The first residents moved in (to the Helios Road part of the development) during March 2002.

BedZED receives power from a small-scale combined heat and power plant (CHP). In conventional energy generation, the heat that is produced as a by-product of generating electricity is lost. With CHP technology, this heat can be harnessed and put to use. At BedZED, the heat from the CHP provides hot water, which is distributed around the site via a district heating system of super-insulated pipes. Should residents or workers require a heating boost, each home or office has a domestic hot water tank that doubles as a radiator.

The CHP plant at BedZED is powered by off-cuts from tree surgery waste that would otherwise go to landfill. Wood is a carbon neutral fuel because the CO2 released when the wood is burned is equal to that absorbed by the tree as it grew.

The development has attracted wide interest and acclaim over the past decade since it was built, and, has won numerous awards. Among other examples of recognition, it was shortlisted for the Stirling Prize for architecture in October 2003, and won awards from the London Evening Standard and RIBA in 2002.

Sutton Ecology Centre
The Sutton Ecology Centre is located in the Carshalton Village part of Sutton borough. The Grounds are a 1.3 hectare Local Nature Reserve and Site of Borough Importance for Nature Conservation, Grade 1.  It is owned by Sutton Council and managed by the Council together with the Friends of Sutton Ecology Centre.

It is an area of mainly open space where visitors can find out about wildlife habitats, alternative energy, recycling, composting, and organic gardening. The centre's activities include running educational visits for schools and community groups, as well as events and volunteer days.

The history of the Ecology Centre is that the grounds were until the late eighties known as the "Lodgelands", named after the old gardens of The Lodge in Carshalton. They were used as a tree nursery until the early 1980s, when they became surplus to requirements. After a prolonged public debate, it was agreed in 1987 to preserve the area as an open space for public use.

Carshalton Environmental Fair

The Environmental Fair is held in Carshalton Park on August Bank Holiday Monday.
It features over 100 stalls and showcases local sustainability initiatives. It also includes music, performing art, poetry, children's activities, campaign groups, local craft, interactive demonstrations, and a farmers' market. Music is performed from three stages and across the genres from rock to folk. The main stage is a natural open-air amphitheatre. There is food and a bar with real ales. The fair attracts on average around 10,000 people. It is organised by EcoLocal with a team of volunteers.

Sutton Community Farm
Sutton Community Farm, the only one of its kind in London, is located in the Wallington part of the borough.  A not-for-profit social enterprise, it occupies a 7.5 acre small-holding of a type originally given to ex-servicemen following the First World War.

Growing the green economy
The London Borough of Sutton has provided funding to grow the green economy by creating a low carbon cluster of green businesses.  The project includes the establishment of a  "Green Business Network", the provision of training, and the creation of employment opportunities for assessors, surveyors, designers and installers.

Straw-bale café
The café in Manor Park, Sutton has a range of environmental features, in particular its straw-bale construction. It was built in 2010 using UK produced straw-bales and natural sustainable materials, a type of construction which means that the building could last for longer than 200 years. It was London's first energy-efficient building to use this method of construction.

Hospitals

St Helier Hospital (full title: St Helier Hospital and Queen Mary's Hospital for Children) in the London Borough of Merton and London Borough of Sutton is run by Epsom and St Helier University Hospitals NHS Trust along with Epsom Hospital. It is located next to the large St Helier estate and close to the major intersection known as Rosehill. The hospital offers a full range of hospital services including a 24-hour accident and emergency department. The site is also home to the South West Renal and Transplantation Service and the Queen Mary's Hospital for Children, a dedicated children's hospital. St Helier Hospital is a major teaching hospital for St George's, University of London, and is the second main teaching site for the clinical years of the medicine degrees outside of St George's Hospital.

Transport

Rail
Sutton has rail services to central London stations, including London Victoria, London Bridge and St Pancras International. Sutton borough has access to the London Underground with the Northern line in neighbouring Merton borough reachable by bus. The London Overground network, completed c. 2010, is 5 to 10 minutes away from Sutton at West Croydon station.

The Sutton & Mole Valley Lines railway route south from Sutton links the borough to Sussex and Surrey to the south, and to central London to the north, providing regular, direct services to stations including Clapham Junction, London Victoria, Dorking, Epsom, Horsham, Wimbledon and West Croydon. Also running through Sutton is the Sutton Loop Line which links St Albans and St Pancras International directly with the stations on the loop. The main station for all these services is Sutton railway station to the south of the town. The station is the largest and busiest in Sutton. Passenger rail services through Croydon are provided by Govia Thameslink Railway under the Southern and Thameslink brands.

Tram

The Tramlink service runs to the north of the borough and a short part of the line falls within it, including two stops: Therapia Lane and Beddington Lane. Transport for London spent several years developing plans for a Sutton Link, which would connect the service to Sutton town centre; however, in July 2020, it announced that plans had been 'paused' following financial negotiations with the Government in light of the COVID-19 pandemic.

Bus

A sizeable bus infrastructure which is part of the London Buses network operates from a main hub on the Sutton one-way system. Services are operated under contract by Abellio London, London General, London United, Metrobus and Quality Line. Route X26 is the longest route in London, operating from Croydon to Heathrow Airport via Kingston.

Road
Sutton is linked into the national motorway network via the A217 and M25 orbital motorway at Junction 8. The M25 skirts the south of the borough, linking Sutton with other parts of London and the surrounding counties. The A24 passes through the north western part of the borough, through North Cheam and onto Epsom, Dorking, Horsham, Worthing, Bognor Regis and Chichester. This follows, in part, the course of Stane Street, an old Roman road linking London and Chichester. The A232 links Sutton with other towns in the borough, also the boroughs of Kingston, Croydon and Bromley.

Air
Heathrow is served by London Buses route X26 and Gatwick by the National Express Coaches A3 route, which stops outside Sutton railway station. Croydon Airport which was partly in the borough of Sutton served as London's main airport in the years prior to the second world war but closed in the 1950s.

Cycling

Although hilly, Sutton is compact and has few major trunk roads running through it. It is on one of the National Cycle Network routes running around South London. The nearby North Downs to the south, part of which falls within the borough boundary, is an area of outstanding natural beauty popular with both on and off-road cyclists.

Travel to work
In March 2011, the main forms of transport that residents used to travel to work were: driving a car or van, 33.1% of all residents aged 16–74; train, 6.6%; bus, minibus or coach, 6.6%; on foot, 5.6%; underground, metro, light rail, tram, 3.9%; work mainly at or from home, 3.1%; passenger in a car or van, 2.0%; cycling 1.5%. Data from the 2011 Census states that the cycle mode share for people cycling to work had fallen from 2.1% since 2001.

Parks and open spaces

Main parks
Varied in size and layout, green spaces range from the compact Manor Park in Sutton town centre and Sutton Green just to the north of Sutton town centre, through the medium-sized Grove Park, which forms a notable part of the Carshalton conservation area, to the large and historic Oaks Park in the south of the borough. In the west of the borough is the large Nonsuch Park.

Just to the north of Sutton town centre there is more extensive green space in the form of Sutton Common, which originally (until the beginning of the 19th century) encompassed the aforementioned Sutton Green. Today, a small portion of Sutton Common is given over to a major junior tennis facility. The common extends both to the east and west of Angel Hill.
Slightly further in the opposite direction out of Sutton lie Banstead Common and Banstead Downs—these start a few hundred yards from the southern end of the town, and extend for an additional mile south in the direction of neighbouring Banstead.

Manor Park was created in 1914 on a site in the town centre opposite the police station. Its grounds include the Sutton War Memorial, which was added in 1921. A fountain was added in 1924. In 2010 its new café of straw-bale construction was London's first environmentally friendly building to use this building method.

Features of interest in the Victorian Grove Park include a white Portland stone bridge, known as the Leoni Bridge where Lower Pond meets the park. Upper Mill is recent reconstruction of a watermill that has existed here from Anglo-Saxon times. The cascade is near the footbridge towards the Stone Court corner of the park. The 1.5m fall is now ornamental in design and was reconstructed in the 1960s. Its original purpose was to create a head of water to power Upper Mill.

Oaks Park has a long history. It was substantially laid out for the Earl of Derby in the 1770s, but its villa dates back to around 1750 and is in that era's fashionable landscape style, with trees forming a perimeter screen and placed in artful clumps to suggest a natural landscape.

Nonsuch Park near Cheam in the west is the last surviving part of the Little Park of Nonsuch, a deer hunting park established by Henry VIII of England surrounding the former Nonsuch Palace.   The name "Nonsuch" was given as, it was claimed, there was "none such place like it" in Europe.

List of parks
The main parks in the borough are:

 Beddington Park
 Carshalton Park
 Cheam Park
 Grove Park
 Lakeside
 Manor Park, Sutton town centre
 Mellows Park
 Nonsuch Park
 Oaks Park
 Rosehill Park East and West
 Overton Park
 Poulter Park Poulter Park
 Queen Mary's Park
 Roundshaw Down
 Royston Park
 Seer's Park
 St Helier Open Space
 The Wandle Walkway

Local nature reserves
In addition, Sutton borough contains a large number for its size of Local Nature Reserves:

 Anton Crescent Wetland has ponds, willow carr and reedbeds, and the ponds never dry out as the rock formation is Oxford Clay. The pools and mud provide a habitat for birds such as the green sandpiper and common snipe.
 Belmont Pastures is a long narrow triangle north of Belmont railway station. It is an old meadow which formerly belonged to Belmont Hospital.
 Cuddington Meadows is mainly chalk grassland with some scrub. Its most important feature is a variety of unusual flowering plants, including greater knapweed, lady's bedstraw and field scabious.
 Devonshire Avenue Nature Area is mainly neutral grassland, but it has areas of chalk grassland, scrub and trees. A notable species is the small blue butterfly, which is rare in the borough. Plants include the nationally scarce ivy broomrape, and kidney vetch and bird's-foot trefoil.
 Roundshaw Downs was in the 19th century an area of farmland, becoming in the first half of the twentieth Croydon Airport. Most of the site is a mixture of chalk and neutral grassland, but there is also some woodland. Areas of unimproved chalk grassland have species typical of this habitat such as common quaking grass, wild carrot and bird's-foot-trefoil. A grassland flower species is greater yellow rattle, which is nationally protected, and Sutton and Croydon are its national strongholds.
 Ruffett and Big Woods on the edge of the borough near Woodmansterne are the largest continuous area of woodland in the borough. Ruffett Wood is mainly sycamore, with some ash and hazel. It also has some plant species indicative of ancient woodland, such as bluebells. Big Wood has even more sycamore, as well as two large oaks and a stand of wood anemone. The site also has numerous bird species.
 Spencer Road Wetlands has since 1991 been managed by the London Wildlife Trust. The site has reed swamps with wetland vegetation, woodland, a sedge-bed and a pond. Insects include the twin-spotted wainscot and crescent moths, and there are birds such as grey heron, reed warbler and kingfishers.
 Sutton Ecology Centre Grounds is in Carshalton and owned by Sutton Council and managed by it and the Friends of Sutton Ecology Centre. Habitats include ponds, woodland, meadows, marshlands. There are also small demonstration gardens. In the south is the old course of the River Wandle, which in now dry most of the time, but still has yellow flag iris. Margaret's Pool has a number of species of dragonfly and damselfly, and the trees surrounding it are sycamore and ash.
 The Spinney, Carshalton, a small L shaped reserve, is a mixture of woodland and scrub, with the main trees being plane and elm. Breeding birds include dunnocks, wrens and blackbirds. Other animals include wood boring beetles and foxes.
 Wandle Valley Wetland has open water and seasonal pools, scrub and wet woodland. There are frogs, toads and newts, together with brown hawker dragonflies and birds including blackcaps and wrens.
 Wilderness Island, near Carshalton, is a  island between two arms of the River Wandle and was once the site of a pleasure garden. It features a fish pond, woodland, and meadows. Trees include the black poplar, and there are birds such as the woodpecker, kingfisher and grebe. There is a variety of butterflies including the speckled wood and holly blue, and the rare hornet clearwing moth.

Lavender fields
There are two historic lavender fields in the borough. One, at Oaks Way, Carshalton Beeches is a not-for-profit community project that manages three acres of lavender. The other, a 25-acre commercial site in Croydon Lane called Mayfield, is popular with tourists. It is located just within the Carshalton South and Clockhouse ward within the London Borough of Sutton. This area was once famous as the "Lavender Capital of the World". From the 18th to the early 20th centuries the North Downs of Surrey, with its chalky free-draining soil, ideal for lavender growing, were at the centre of worldwide production of lavender. It was a very prosperous part of the local agriculture. Blue fields could be seen all over Mitcham, Croydon, Wallington, Banstead, Carshalton and Sutton. The scale of the operation can be understood from the fact that the Daily News in 1914 was able to state:

Sports facilities and clubs

Carshalton has two football clubs: Carshalton Athletic F.C. (home ground at The War Memorial Sports Ground, Colston Avenue, and play in the ) and Carshalton FC (at Beddington Park).

Wallington has a Non-League football club Crescent Rovers F.C. who play at the Wallington Sports & Social Club.

Sutton and Epsom RFC is a rugby union club based at Rugby Lane, in Cheam, London, having been formed in 1881. The Club run six Men's teams and two women's sides, plus they have one of the largest and best run mini and junior rugby sections in the country

The Croydon Pirates despite their name play just inside the borough of Sutton, at Waddon and are one of the most successful teams in the British Baseball Federation.

Sutton Cricket Club is based in Cheam Road, Sutton, (entrance in Gander Green Lane.) The Club's 1st XI plays at the highest level of the sport available to it, the England & Wales Cricket Board's, 'Surrey Championship Premier Division.’

Round Towers GAA, Senior Gaelic Football Club, Sean Treacy's Hurling Club and Croydon Camogie Club.

Rosehill boasts an ETTA premier level Table Tennis Club, Rosehill TTC who play in the Sutton & District League and the Thames Valley League.

At the Westcroft Leisure Centre, in Carshalton there are health and fitness facilities including two swimming pools, sports hall, squash court and fitness centre. There is also a children's play area called Kid's Kingdom. Westcroft is also home to Sutton Pumas basketball club.

In 2012 Westcroft underwent a major renovation costing £11 million, bringing improved swimming facilities, a dance studio and beauty treatment rooms. There are eight courts in the sports hall, providing facilities for activities including badminton, gymnastics, trampolining, basketball, football, netball and volleyball.

In addition, Carshalton Library moved to the Westcroft centre, as part of the renovation.

There are also two public basketball courts in the Rosehill district of Sutton borough.

The Sutton and Epsom Weightlifting Club meet at Sutton Arena near to St Hellier's Hospital to the North of Sutton.

Climate 
Sutton has a temperate climate in common with most areas of Great Britain, it is similar to that of Greenwich in Inner London: its Köppen climate classification is Cfb. Its mean annual temperature of 9.6 °C is similar to that experienced throughout the Weald, and slightly cooler than nearby areas such as the Sussex coast and central London. Rainfall is considerably below England's average (1971–2000) level of 838 mm, and every month is drier overall than the England average.

The nearest weather station is at Gatwick Airport.

Town twinning

Sutton's twin towns are as follows:

 Gagny in France
 Gladsaxe in Denmark
 Minden in Germany
 Charlottenburg-Wilmersdorf in Germany

In addition, there is a friendship link with:

 Tavarnelle in Italy

The Sutton twin towns mural on a building in Sutton town centre is made up of individual paintings of all the twin towns. It was created in 1993. The building is at the junction of Sutton High Street and Sutton Court Road.

See also
 Grade I and II* listed buildings in the London Borough of Sutton

References

External links

London Borough of Sutton
OpenlyLocal.com page for London Borough of Sutton

 
Sutton
1965 establishments in the United Kingdom